Slam is the third and final studio album by the Boston indie rock band Big Dipper. The album was released in 1990 on Epic Records, making it the group's major-label debut. The band supported the album with a North American tour. They were dropped from the label a year later.

Production
Recorded in North Carolina, the album was coproduced by Steve Haigler. Many of its songs are about the music business. The band used samples, horns, and synthesizers on some of the songs.

Critical reception

The Boston Globe wrote that "the band in fine form, still writing terse, insanely catchy, oft sly and oblique pop songs." The Republican noted that the album "contains some sparkling melodies, solid lyrics and interesting, guitar-based arrangements." The Washington Times opined that "the musicians construct uncompromisingly tuneful pop-rock tunes while disassembling lyrical conventions."

Track listing

References

Big Dipper (band) albums
1990 albums
Epic Records albums